Shrubsole is a surname. Notable people with the surname include:
 Alison Shrubsole (1925–2002), British educationist and university administrator
 Anya Shrubsole (born 1991), English women's cricketer
Guy Shrubsole, British researcher, writer and campaigner.
 William Shrubsole (1760–1806), English musician and composer
 William Shrubsole (minister) (1729–1797), English nonconformist minister and author